In The Willows are a six-piece alternative folk band from Waterford, Ireland composed of David Greene (vocals, guitar), Tara Heffernan (vocals, piano), Michael Grace (vocals, bass), Paul O'Shea (drums), John Madigan (piano, bouzouki), Rowan Sherlock (violin, viola)

History (2011 – present)
In The Willows formed in 2011, releasing their début album Before Everybody Disappears in 2014 which charted in the Irish Albums Chart at number 95 in its first week of being released.

Members
 David Greene – Lead vocals, guitar, Harmonica
 Tara Heffernan – Vocals 
 Michael Grace – Bass, Backing vocals
 Paul O'Shea – Drums, Percussion
 John Madigan – Piano, Bouzouki, backing vocals
 Rowan Sherlock – Violin, Viola, backing vocals

Discography

Albums

EPs

Singles

References

External links
 

2011 establishments in Ireland
Musical groups established in 2011